is a Japanese folktale or fairy tale about a tanuki (raccoon dog), that uses its shapeshifting powers to reward its rescuer for his kindness.

Overview 
The fairy tale version has been translated into English as "The Accomplished and Lucky Teakettle" (1871) by Mitford and as "The Wonderful Tea Kettle" (1886) in the crepe-paper book series published by T. Hasegawa. The raccoon dog is ill-treated as a tea-kettle at a temple and sold off; it later performs a dance and tightrope walking routine, and the subsequent owner turned showman acquires great wealth.

In most folk tale versions, the raccoon dog or fox transforms into a kettle so that its human friend or benefactor can make profit by selling the fake kettle, typically to a priest.

In legend, Bunbuku chagama is the name of a tea kettle owned by priest Shukaku who turned out to be an ancient raccoon dog or mujina, the supposed kettle still on view at  temple which Shukaku served.

Etymology 

One suggested hypothesis is that bunbuku is an onomatopeic word mimicking the sound of boiling water, while the character buku (fuku) in the name denotes "good luck" or "good fortune".

A second explanation is that bunbuku when written as  means "sharing (bun) the wealth/fortune/luck (fuku)". This is according to the origin tale (engi) surrounding Morin-ji, and the essay Kasshi yawa.

This explanation is given, for example, by Toriyama Sekien.

Fairy tale 

The following summary is based on three early English translations of the fairy tale version.

At a temple called  in Kōzuke Province (now Gunma Prefecture), the master priest (abbot) owns a chagama (tea kettle). When the priest sets the kettle on a hearth, the kettle sprouts a head and a tail (or legs as well), and turns into a half-badger, half tea-kettle creature. What is loosely translated as a "badger" here is strictly speaking a tanuki or raccoon dog.

The priest and his novices subdue it, and since it reverts to the form of an ordinary kettle, they sell it to a traveling tinker or rag-peddler. The kettle reveals its half-tanuki form to the peddler, and the merchant acts on a friend's advice to command the beast to turn tricks, or, is persuaded by the tanuki itself, which bargains to perform acrobatics in exchange for being well-treated. The peddler agrees to neither put it over hot flame nor stow it away in a stuffy box, and share what food he has.

The man sets up a circus-like roadside attraction and charges admission for people to see the tea-kettle badger walking a tightrope to the tune of music. The man becomes wealthy, and returns the kettle to Morin-ji temple.

Translations 
Algernon Bertram Mitford published a version of it entitled "The Accomplished and Lucky Teakettle" in Tales of Old Japan (1871), illustrated by woodcuts from drawings by the artist "Ôdaké".

A similar (slightly more elaborate) plot is found in "The Wonderful Tea Kettle" (June 1886), the retelling by Mrs. T. H. James (Kate James), published by Hasegawa Takejirō as Japanese Fairy Tale Series No. 16 (these books are classed in the chirimen-bon or "crepe-paper books" genre).

Iwaya's version that appeared in Nihon Otogibanashi is said to have established enduring recognition of the tale in Japan.

The tale has also been referred to as "The Lucky Tea-Kettle" by Basil Hall Chamberlain, under a handbook entry for "Fairy tales".

Folktale 
The tale group "Bunbuku chagama (Bunbuku Tea-kettle)" has been categorized as Types of Japanese Folktales No. 130 by Keigo Seki. Seki here treats the tale group as one involving the fox, and summarizes as follows:

The dancing raccoon dog, which is a familiar motif in the fairy tale, is comparatively rare among folk tales.

Fox and tanuki 
Seki's Japanese publications (Nihon mukashibanashi shūsei and Nihon mukashibanashi shūsei)  classes the tale group as number 237B, and allows either fox or tanuki for the role.

Indeed, there are both fox or tanuki folktale examples.

One example involving a "badger" is the English-summarized folktale "Bunbuku Teakettle" collected from Shimoina District, Nagano. This tale is quite similar to the untranslated fox tale "" ("Shapeshifting teakettle") from Shiwa District, Iwate: in either case, the beast-kettle is sold for 3 ryō and flees to the mountains in the end.

Fuzzy classification 
It was the opinion of Kunio Yanagita that tales in this Bunbuku group and  tale group[s] are of a common type in the wider sense and not quite distinguishable. This is because "Fox Harlot" not only transforms into harlot, but in some cases may change into a teakettle, horse, and harlot, exhibiting three transformation motifs in all. One folktale Seki entitled "The Good Fortune kettle" is such a case, where the fox transforms into a kettle, girl, and horse.

Seki also expressed opinion similar to Yanagita's, saying that tale types such as "Bunbuku chagama", "The Fox and Horse-dealer", and "The Fox Prostitute/Harlot" all belong to a larger group of tales known in the West as the "Sorcerer's Apprentice" type (ATU 325).

Origins 

The fairy tale version is thought to be connected to the legend about an inexhaustible tea kettle at the temple  in Tatebayashi, Gunma, owned by a priest named  who turned out to be an ancient mujina (raccoon dog or badger).

The nineteenth century fairy tale (such as represented by Iwaya Sazanami's version) may also be descended from the seventeenth to eighteenth century Edo Period popular fiction of the akahon type.

Morin-ji legend 

The priest Shukaku (who later turned out to be a raccoon dog) had accompanied the priest who founded the Morinji-temple during the Ōei era (year 1426); then while serving the 7th abbot Shukaku brought out an inexhaustible tea-kettle or cauldron (chagama), able to supply hot water day and night without running out, and thus was able to serve tea to over one thousand priests (the occasion was a thousand-man  held in 1570). Shukaku said the kettle was called Bunbuku chagama because it had eight virtues and shared (bun) its fortunes (fuku); it imparted immunity from thirst ailment, virtue in both scholarly and martial arts, intelligence, fearlessness, popular affection, luck and advancement, and longevity.

Shukaku 
As to what became of Shukaku, during the tenure of the 10th abbot at the temple, rumors began to circulate that he would all of a sudden grow furry in his limbs and sprout a tail. Shukaku then confessed to being a mujina aged several thousand years. He had heard the preaching of the Buddha Sakyamuni at Holy Eagle Peak, moved to the Tang Empire and has lived in Japan these 800 or so years. Before he left he showed his friends conjured up visions of the Battle of Yashima and the Buddha preaching before a crowd of Buddhist saints (rakan).

The aged raccoon dog first living in India and China before coming to Japan resembles the circumstance of Tamamo-no-Mae, the legendary female nine-tailed fox, and the motif is thought to be modeled on that vixen legend.

Here, his past reached further into remote antiquity since he says he came to Japan with Jofuku 1800 years before, after living India for 500 years and in China for 1000 years.

Sources of Morin-ji legend 
This legend is documented in origin-tales (engi) concerning Morinji and the tea-kettle, published in several editions by Morin-ji temple. The title  is borne by the earliest edition (nominally 1587, but probably dating to around the Genroku era or c. 1700) as well as later undated editions (possibly c. 1800).

The text of the later edition of Bunbuku chagama ryakuengi contains more detail (motifs), and is identical to the account found in the essay  (1821–1841) by Kiyoshi Matsura.

Edo period fiction 

Bunbuku chagama exist in popular fiction or kusazōshi format, from the akahon or "red book" period (late 17th to early 18th century).
 
One example is an edition of Bunbuku chagama printed by Urokogataya, dating to c. 1735–45. The storyline is as follows. A monk named Bunbuku serving Lord Higashiyama in Kyoto captures an old raccoon dog (mujina) by causing the creature to lower its guard by joining the monk in dance. Bunbuku and his comrades, the four tea monks, decide to butcher the creature and make it into soup. The creature flees but is cornered and turns itself into a tea kettle. The monks place the kettle on fire and are amused to see it turn halfway back into the furry creature, and it escapes. The lord hears of this incident, and declares this to be disgraceful, ordering the monks to be stripped of clothes and cast out. The old raccoon dog finds the monks and decides to stretch out the skin of its testicles and cover them up like a blanket, by way of revenge. The monks were slightly discomfited, but when they woke up, captured the beast and presented it to their lord, and are restored to his good grace.

This Urokogata edition is considered a remake from 's Bunbuku chagama, dating to the Kyōhō era (1716–1736). This text follows a similar story-line except it is a fox which is imperiled with being cooked by the Higashiyama priests and turns into a tea kettle, and the fox entrusts the revenge to the raccoon dog. This work too has its precedence, a similar tale dating back to around the Enpō or Tenna eras (1673–1684), and entitled .

In popular culture 
An animated movie based on the tale was produced in 1928 by Yokohama Cinema Shoukai.

Passing reference to this story occurs in the animated film Pom Poko (1994, Studio Ghibli).

In the Naruto series, Shukaku, the One-Tail, who is modeled after a tanuki, is mentioned to have originally been sealed into a teapot. It is revealed later that his former jinchūriki (human container) was an old man named Bunbuku.

In Ichiro by Ryan Inzana, the legend of the tanuki teapot (chagama) is woven into a side-story of an American teenager.

During the Google Doodle Champion Island Games, one of the champions, referred either as "Tanooki" or "Tanuki", is based on the titular character of this tale.

See also 
 Kachi-kachi Yama, another Japanese folktale on the tanuki

Explanatory notes

References 
Citations

Bibliography

External links

"The Accomplished and Lucky Tea-Kettle", translation by Algernon Bertram Freeman-Mitford in Tales of Old Japan
"The Magic Kettle" adaptation by Andrew Lang in The Crimson Fairy Book

Buddhist folklore
Japanese fairy tales
Japanese folklore
Fiction about shapeshifting
Bake-danuki